Thomas Bambridge (died 1741) was a British attorney who became a notorious warden of the Fleet Prison in London.

Bambridge became warden of the Fleet in 1728. He had paid, with another person, £5,000 to John Huggins for the wardenship.  He was found guilty of extortion, and, according to a committee of the House of Commons appointed to inquire into the state of English gaols, arbitrarily and unlawfully loaded with irons, put into dungeons, and destroyed prisoners for debt, treating them in the most barbarous and cruel manner, in violation of the law. He was committed to Newgate Prison, and an act was passed to prevent his enjoying the office of warden.

Notes

External links
"Ungovernable" prisoners: Fleet Prison during the 1720s
This Day in Georgia History: 27 February 1729

1741 deaths
British lawyers
British prison governors
Extortionists
Year of birth unknown